The north face of the Grand Teton is  a technical rock climbing in Wyoming. Today the route is usually climbed by a variation that avoids the chimneys which are often wet or icy. The route is recognized in the historic climbing text Fifty Classic Climbs of North America and considered a classic around the world.

References

External links 
rockclimbing.com
mountainproject.com

Climbing routes
Grand Teton National Park